I Was a Teenage Zombie is a 1987 American comedy-horror film.

Plot 
The film begins like a 1980s comedy with teens looking to purchase some marijuana but turns into comedy/horror genre when a drug dealer is pushed into the river and becomes a zombie.

Production 
The film was shot on location in and around New York City, especially Brooklyn, Fort Lee, Englewood, Tenafly, Riverside Park, and Rockland County.  Some of the scenes near the beginning of the film were shot at Brooklyn College in Flatbush, Brooklyn.

Original Motion Picture Soundtrack 
The film's title track was recorded by the American band The Fleshtones, and the subsequent video was given rotation on MTV. Other bands and artists appearing on the film's soundtrack include: The Del Fuegos, The dB's, Dream Syndicate, the Violent Femmes, The Waitresses, The Smithereens, Los Lobos, Alex Chilton and the Ben Vaughn Group. The original soundtrack record is out of print.

Reception 
Writing in the Zombie Movie Encyclopedia, academic Peter Dendle called it an "irreverent amateur parody of high school romance films in the Sixteen Candles tradition."  Dendle cited the film as one of the forebears of the zombie romantic comedy trend of the 1980s and 1990s.

References

External links 

 
 

1987 films
1987 horror films
1980s comedy horror films
American comedy horror films
American zombie comedy films
Films set in Brooklyn
Films shot in New Jersey
1987 comedy films
1980s English-language films
1980s American films